{{Infobox song contest national year 
| Contest                = Junior
| Year                   = 2012
| Country                = Netherlands
| Preselection           = Junior Songfestival 201233% Jury33% Kids Jury33% Televoting| Preselection date      = Semi-finals:22 September 201229 September 2012Final:6 October 2012
| Entrant                = Femke
| Song                   = Tik Tak Tik
| Final result           = 7th, 69 points
}}
The Netherlands will select their Junior Eurovision Song Contest 2012 entry through Junior Songfestival'', a national selection consisting of eight songs.

In the second semi-final, there was a tie between Femke, and Sterre. It was decided Femke would have the second place spot due to the higher points on public vote, with Sterre getting the wildcard, thanks to the internet voters.

Before Junior Eurovision

Junior Songfestival 2012 
The songs were split into two semi-finals. From each semi-final two sentries will qualify for the final based on the decision of adult and child juries as well as televoting. The fifth entry in the final will be chosen by online voting (web wildcard).

Competing entries

Semi-final 1

Semi-final 2

Final

At Junior Eurovision

Voting

Notes

References

Junior Eurovision Song Contest
2012
Netherlands